Dew is water in the form of droplets that appears on thin, exposed objects in the morning or evening due to condensation. 

As the exposed surface cools by radiating its heat, atmospheric moisture condenses at a rate greater than that at which it can evaporate, resulting in the formation of water droplets.

When temperatures are low enough, dew takes the form of ice, called frost.

Because dew is related to the temperature of surfaces, in late summer it forms most easily on surfaces that are not warmed by conducted heat from deep ground, such as grass, leaves, railings, car roofs, and bridges.

Formation 
Water vapor will condense into droplets depending on the temperature. The temperature at which droplets form is called the dew point. When surface temperature drops, eventually reaching the dew point, atmospheric water vapor condenses to form small droplets on the surface. This process distinguishes dew from those hydrometeors (meteorological occurrences of water), which form directly in air that has cooled to its dew point (typically around condensation nuclei), such as fog or clouds. The thermodynamic principles of formation, however, are the same. Dew is commonly formed during select times of the day. Nights, early mornings, and early evenings are all times during which dew is likely to be found.

Occurrence 
Adequate cooling of the surface typically takes place when it loses more energy by infrared radiation than it receives as solar radiation from the sun, which is especially the case on clear nights. Poor thermal conductivity restricts the replacement of such losses from deeper ground layers, which are typically warmer at night. Preferred objects of dew formation are thus poor conducting or well isolated from the ground, and non-metallic, while shiny metal coated surfaces are poor infrared radiators. Preferred weather conditions include the absence of clouds and little water vapor in the higher atmosphere to minimize greenhouse effects and sufficient humidity of the air near the ground. Typical dew nights are classically considered calm, because the wind transports (nocturnally) warmer air from higher levels to the cold surface. However, if the atmosphere is the major source of moisture (this type is called dewfall), a certain amount of ventilation is needed to replace the vapor that is already condensed. The highest optimum wind speeds could be found on arid islands. If the wet soil beneath is the major source of vapor, however (this type of dew formation is called distillation), wind always seems adverse.

The processes of dew formation do not restrict its occurrence to the night and the outdoors. They are also working when eyeglasses get steamy in a warm, wet room or in industrial processes. However, the term condensation is preferred in these cases.

Measurement 
A classical device for dew measurement is the drosometer. A small, (artificial) condenser surface is suspended from an arm attached to a pointer or a pen that records the weight changes of the condenser on a drum. Besides being very wind sensitive, however, this, like all artificial surface devices, only provides a measure of the meteorological potential for dew formation. The actual amount of dew in a specific place is strongly dependent on surface properties. For its measurement, plants, leaves, or whole soil columns are placed on a balance with their surface at the same height and in the same surroundings as would occur naturally, thus providing a small lysimeter. Further methods include estimation by means of comparing the droplets to standardized photographs, or volumetric measurement of the amount of water wiped from the surface. Some of these methods include guttation, while others only measure dewfall and/or distillation.

Significance 

Due to its dependence on radiation balance, dew amounts can reach a theoretical maximum of about 0.8 mm per night; measured values, however, rarely exceed 0.5 mm. In most climates of the world, the annual average is too small to compete with rain. In regions with considerable dry seasons, adapted plants like lichen or pine seedlings benefit from dew. Large-scale, natural irrigation without rainfall, such as in the Atacama Desert and Namib desert, however, is mostly attributed to fog water. In the Negev Desert in Israel, dew has been found to account for almost half of the water found in three dominant desert species, Salsola inermis, Artemisia sieberi and Haloxylon scoparium.

Another effect of dew is its hydration of fungal substrates and the mycelia of species such as Pleated Inkcaps on lawns and Phytophthora infestans which causes blight on potato plants.

Historic 
The book On the Universe (De Mundo) (composed before 250 BC or between 350 and 200 BC) stated: "Dew is moisture minute in composition falling from a clear sky; ice is water congealed in a condensed form from a clear sky; hoar-frost is congealed dew, and 'dew-frost' is dew which is half congealed".

In Greek mythology, Ersa is the goddess and personification of dew.
Also, according to the myth, the dew in the morning was created when Eos (Ersa's aunt), goddess of the dawn, cried for her son's death, although lately he received immortality.

Dew, known in Hebrew as טל (tal), is significant in the Jewish religion for agricultural and theological purposes. On the first day of Passover, the Chazan, dressed in a white kittel, leads a service in which he prays for dew between that point and Sukkot. During the rainy season between December and Passover there are also additions in the Amidah for blessed dew to come together with rain. There are many midrashim that refer to dew as being the tool for ultimate resurrection. "Dewy" or "my father is the morning dew" are approximate etymologies of the Hebrew given name, Avital.

In the Biblical Torah or Old Testament, dew is used symbolically in : "My doctrine shall drop as the rain, my speech shall distill as the dew, as the small rain upon the tender herb, and as the showers upon the grass."

Artificial harvesting 

The harvesting of dew potentially allows water availability in areas where supporting weather conditions, such as rain, are lacking. Several man-made devices such as antique big stone piles in Ukraine, medieval dew ponds in southern England, and volcanic stone covers on the fields of Lanzarote have been thought to be dew-catching devices, but could be shown to work on other principles. At present, the International Organization for Dew Utilization (OPUR) is working on effective, foil-based condensers for regions where rain or fog cannot cover water needs throughout the year.

Large-scale dew harvesting systems have been made by the Indian Institute of Management Ahmedabad (IIMA) with the participation of OPUR in the coastal, semiarid region of Kutch.These condensers can harvest more than 200 liters (on average) of dew water per night for about 90 nights in the October-to-May dew season. The IIMA research laboratory has shown that dew can serve as a supplementary source of water in coastal arid areas.

A large-scale dew harvesting scheme envisages circulating cold sea water in EPDM collectors near the seashore. These condense dew and fog to supply clean drinking water. Other, more recent, studies display possible roof integration for dew harvesting devices.

References

External links 

OPUR (International Organisation for Dew Utilization)
International Conference on Fog, Fog Collection and Dew
Audio Recording of Cantor Yossele Rosenblatt's Dew Service from the Florida Atlantic University Judaica Sound Archives (Hebrew audio)

Psychrometrics
Precipitation